Laurel Hill, also known as Laurel Ridge or Laurel Mountain, is a  mountain in Pennsylvania's Allegheny Mountains. This ridge is flanked by Negro Mountain to its east and Chestnut Ridge to its west. The mountain is home to six state parks: Laurel Ridge State Park, Laurel Mountain State Park, Linn Run State Park, Kooser State Park, Laurel Hill State Park, and Ohiopyle State Park. The  Laurel Highlands Hiking Trail runs the length of the ridge.

Laurel Hill has an average elevation of  along its length, while there are individual "knobs" that rise above . South of the Youghiogheny Gorge, a short ridge, generally still labeled Laurel Hill, at the edge of Ohiopyle State Park, reaches above .

The industrial city of Johnstown and historic borough of Ligonier are located near its northern end, while the recreational boroughs of Confluence and Ohiopyle are located towards its southern end. Two major highways cross Laurel Hill, the Pennsylvania Turnpike and U.S. Route 30. The abandoned Laurel Hill Tunnel goes beneath Laurel Hill. A number of smaller state roads cross at other points on the mountain.

Geology

Laurel Hill is made up of Mississippian and Pennsylvanian clastic sedimentary rocks, consisting mostly of conglomerate, sandstone, and shale. Formations include the Burgoon, Mauch Chunk, Pottsville, and Allegheny. The mountain is anticlinal in structure.

Along the length of this ridge there are several prominent knobs that rise from the ridgeline. They are as follows south to north: Sugarloaf Knob , Highpoint , Birch Rock Hill , Painter Rock Hill , Bald Knob , Ulery Hill , Pea Vine Hill , Pikes Peak , Mystery Hill , and Sugar Camp Hill .

Climate
The Laurel Hill region shares the humid continental climate of the Mid-Atlantic region in which it is located.

The mountain ridge is oriented at right angles to approaching weather systems, forcing prevailing westerly airflows upward. As rising air cools, moisture in the air mass condenses; once reaching the saturation point, precipitation results. Laurel Hill may also act as a barrier to weather systems and slow the movement of storms, which has an impact on the local area and forms a microclimate. Although the mountain is not high enough to create its own weather, its orography is enough to gently nudge weather from hot to warm, cool to cold, and from rain to snow; along with moisture from the Great Lakes, the latter can result in heavy snowfall during winter months. The mountain ridge can be  cooler than surrounding towns and valleys, depending on other weather variables.

Flora and fauna

Laurel Hill has a diversity of habitats, and with that comes a variety of birds and mammals. Ravens and wild turkeys are frequently seen, while the hermit thrush, Canada warbler, brown creeper, and winter wren all nest near the bog at Spruce Flats. During the summer, black-throated blue warblers, blue-headed and red-eyed vireos can be seen. Raptors on the mountain include the broad-winged, red-tailed and red-shouldered hawks, and barred owls.

Commonly seen mammals on the mountain include white-tailed deer, chipmunks, and red and gray squirrels. More elusive animals include the woodchuck, raccoon, and opossum. Black bear have also been seen, but are shy and reclusive and not likely to be encountered.

Snakes including the timber rattler and copperhead also make their home on Laurel Hill around rocks and scree areas.

References

Sundquist, Bruce and William J. Curry, eds. (2004) A Hiker's Guide to the Laurel Highlands Trail, Sixth edition, Sierra Club, Pennsylvania Chapter and Western Pennsylvania Conservancy, Pittsburgh, Pennsylvania.
Beck, Michael, George Cannelos, John Clark, William Curry and Charles Loehr (1975) The Laurel Hill Study. Laurel Highlands Conservation and Development Project; Furnace Run, Laughlintown, Pennsylvania.
Dutcher, Russell R., John C. Ferm, Norman K. Flint and E.G. Williams (1959) "Field Trip #2: The Pennsylvanian of Western Pennsylvania". In Guidebook for Field Trips Pittsburgh Meeting, 1959. Geological Society of America, Boulder, Colorado.
Alan R. Geyer (1979) "Outstanding Geologic Features of Pennsylvania", Geological Survey of Pennsylvania
Charles H. Shultz (1999) The Geology of Pennsylvania, Geological Survey of Pennsylvania 
Jere Martin (1997) Pennsylvania Almanac. Stackpole Books, 

Mountains of Pennsylvania
Allegheny Mountains
Laurel Highlands
Landforms of Somerset County, Pennsylvania
Landforms of Westmoreland County, Pennsylvania
Landforms of Cambria County, Pennsylvania
Landforms of Fayette County, Pennsylvania